Lymm is a village and civil parish in the Borough of Warrington, Cheshire, England, which incorporates the hamlets of Booths Hill, Broomedge, Church Green, Deansgreen, Heatley, Heatley Heath, Little Heatley, Oughtrington, Reddish, Rushgreen and Statham. At the 2021 United Kingdom census it had a population of 12,700.

History 
The name Lymm, of Celtic origins, means a "place of running water" and is likely derived from an ancient stream that ran through the village centre. The village appears as "Limme" in the Domesday Book of 1086.

Lymm was an agricultural village until the Industrial Revolution, which brought the Bridgewater Canal and the Warrington and Altrincham Junction Railway to the village. The village played a prominent role within the salt extraction industry, gold beating industry and cotton industry (many of its inhabitants were fustian cutters).

Lymm Heritage Centre, which opened in June 2017, is in the centre of the village on Legh Street. It hosts exhibitions related to local history as well as activities for schools and visitors.

Morris dancing was taking place in Lymm as early as 1817, often appearing in the village at Rushbearing time throughout the Victorian era. Morris dancing continues to feature within the village with Lymm Morris dancers frequently performing at the Lymm May Queen Festival, Rushbearingand Dickensian Festival.

In 2017, Lymm was voted as one of the 'Best Places to Live' according to The Times and The Sunday Times list.

Governance 
Lymm lies within the parliamentary constituency of Warrington South. The constituency is regarded as a bellwether or marginal seat. As of the 2019 General Election, it is represented by Conservative MP Andy Carter who had a 3.2% majority.  

On a local council level, the village is split between Lymm South ward and Lymm North and Thelwall ward within the Borough of Warrington. As of the  2021 Warrington Borough Council election, Lymm South has two councillors, one Liberal Democrat and one Conservative, while Lymm North and Thelwall has three councillors, all Liberal Democrats. 

There is also a 12-member Lymm Parish Council. Following the 2021 elections, there are 11 Liberal Democrats and 1 Conservative councillors.

Lymm is twinned with Meung-sur-Loire, an ancient village and commune near Orléans, France.

Education 

Lymm High School accepts students from Lymm and the surrounding villages and hamlets. It was judged as 'Good' in its 2022 Ofsted inspection with a planned early re-inspection due in 2024 as the school was deemed to be of almost 'Outstanding' standard.

Lymm is also in the catchment for Altrincham Grammar School for Boys and Altrincham Grammar School for Girls.

There are four primary schools within Lymm. Three of the primary schools – Oughtrington Primary School (Ofsted rating 'Outstanding', 2020), Ravenbank Community Primary School (Ofsted rating 'Outstanding', 2008) and Statham Primary Schoo| (Ofsted rating 'Good', 2018) – formed as an Academy (The Beam Education Trust) in May 2021. The fourth primary school is Cherry Tree Primary School in the southern part of Lymm, rated as 'Outstanding' at its last Ofsted inspection.

The Manchester Japanese School (マンチェスター日本人補習授業校 Manchesutā Nihonjin Hoshū Jugyō Kō), a weekend Japanese educational programme, is held at the Language Centre at Lymm High School.

Landmarks 

Lymm village centre is a designated conservation area, notable for its historic buildings, both listed and unlisted including the French-style terracotta former town hall, St Peter's Church and Lymm Hall. Another is Oughtrington Hall and Lodge (formerly owned by a cadet branch of the Leigh family) this is now Lymm High School. Foxley Hall, home to a cadet branch of the ancient Booth family before ownership passed to the Carlisle family, is no longer standing, but fustian-cutting cottages on Church Road and Arley Grove do survive.

The parish church of St Peter, Oughtrington, is an example of Gothic Revival architecture. St Mary's Church, Lymm, overlooking Lymm Dam and dating back to 1521, was rebuilt in the 19th Century due to being in a state of disrepair.

Lymm Cross, usually known simply as "the Cross", is a Grade I listed structure dating from the 17th century, restored in 1897.

A “dinosaur” (reptile) footprint was discovered in the Victorian era, in one of Lymm’s many quarries, which is thought to be from the Triassic period. It is on display in the centre of the village.

Spud Wood is a recreational area, located next to the Bridgewater Canal, managed by the Woodland Trust. In 2014 the community was granted a license to run a wood allotment scheme where local residents can coppice and fell wood. There is also a community orchard located in grounds behind Oughtrington Community Centre – run by the same local group.

Transport 
The M56 (junctions 7, 8 and 9) and M6 (junction 19 and 20) motorways are both within  of Lymm. The conjunction of these motorways with the A50 is known as the Lymm Interchange, and hosts a service station known as the Poplar 2000 services, a well-used truck stop. The A56 also passes just south of the village, connecting the nearby towns of Warrington and Altrincham. The CAT5/5A buses to Lymm from Warrington and Altrincham are frequent on weekdays and Saturdays.

There is an annual summer festival celebrating various modes of transport, from canal boats to vintage vehicles, which takes place in the village.

Waterways 
The Bridgewater Canal passes through the centre of Lymm. The Manchester Ship Canal passes to the north, and beyond its route lies the River Mersey. To the east of Lymm the River Bollin flows along the village's border with Warburton and the borough of Trafford. A number of small brooks feed the popular tourist attraction of Lymm Dam, built in 1824 to enable the construction of the Stockport–Warrington Road (now known as the A56).

Railways 

Lymm railway station was on Whitbarrow Road. It opened on 1 November 1853 as part of the Warrington and Altrincham Junction railway. There was a further station at Heatley, on Mill Lane, for salt and lead.  To the east, the track ran via Dunham into Broadheath and the Manchester network. To the west, the track used to run into Warrington, via Latchford, and the tar processing on Loushers Lane, then into Bank Quay Low Level. 

The line closed to passengers on 10 September 1962; it was officially closed to all types of traffic on 7 July 1985, but lasted a few months. Then it became financially unviable, and the tracks and sleepers were rapidly lifted. Lymm today has no railway station; the closest stations are at Glazebrook, Birchwood, Warrington, Knutsford and Altrincham.

Cycleways 
Today the old Railway through Lymm forms a good stretch of the Trans Pennine Trail, with a ranger station at Statham, near the centre of the village.  In 2022, upgrade work to certain sections of the trail commenced to provide updated all weather surfaces for users.

Demography 
Note: statistics expressed as percentages may not add up to 100%. Census data is based on that of Lymm Ward from 2021 and 2011 censuses.

Population 
 Total population: 12, 700 residents
 Households: 5,300
 Male:female ratio: 47.9%:52.1%
 Average age of population: 46 years

Ethnicity breakdown 
 95.2% White
 2.2% Mixed
 2.0% Asian
 0.3% Black
 0.4% Other

Highest qualifications 
 10.2% have no qualifications.
 4.8% have an apprenticeship qualification.
 33.6% have a level 1, 2 or 3 or qualification.
 49.4% have a level 4 qualification or higher.

RAF Air Cadets
2137 (Lymm) Squadron formed in 1964 as part of the programme to reestablish units that had been closed following the Second World War. They formed at Park Road in Broomedge with a wooden spooner hut. In 2015 this was demolished to make way for a new £300,000 facility which was opened in 2016.
In April 2018 the Squadron lead the Royal Air Force Air Cadets action to commemorate the Royal Air Force centenary by travelling to the first RAF airfield at Saint-Omer in France and parading on behalf of the RAF and Ministry of Defence.

Sport 
Association football is played in Lymm, there are adult and junior teams playing at Lymm Rovers F.C. and another junior team –  Lymm Piranhas J.F.C.. Lymm Rugby Union Club fields four teams on a regular basis.

There is angling at Lymm Dam and at several other fisheries including Heatley Mere and Meadow View. Angling is represented by the Lymm Angling Club.

Lymm has a number of sports facilities, including:
 Lymm Golf Club
 Lymm Lawn Tennis Club 
 Lymm Croquet Club 
 Lymm Oughtrington Park Cricket Club  – whose home ground is in the former grounds of Oughtrington Hall, a former ancestral home of a cadet branch of the Leigh family
 Lymm Leisure Centre, which is next door to the cricket club at Lymm High School – has a swimming pool, badminton court and gym facilities
 Crown green bowling takes place in Stage Lane, the Oughtrington Club having been established over a hundred years

Lymm has a number of cycling (Lymm Velo Club), triathlon (Cheshire CAT) and running clubs (Lymm Runners).

Notable people 
 Elizabeth Pulman (1836 in Lymm – 1900), British-born New Zealand photographer, the country's first female professional photographer, emigrated 1861
 Gerard Dewhurst J.P. (1872–1956), English cotton merchant, banker and amateur footballer, earning one international cap for England in 1895; grew up at Oughtrington Hall in Lymm
 Cicely Fox Smith (1882 in Lymm – 1954), English poet and writer
 Kenneth Carlisle (1882 in Lymm – 1967), English cricketer active from 1903 to 1905 who played for Oxford University
 Robert Westall (1929–1993), author, lived on Woodland Drive in Lymm until his death
 Sir John Stalker (1939–2019), former Deputy Chief Constable of Greater Manchester Police, lived in Lymm
 Alex Timpson MBE (1946 in Lymm – 2016), British campaigner for children's rights
 Andrew Murray (born 1956), English professional golfer, lives in Lymm
 Aiden Byrne (born 1972), English chef who starred in Great British Menu, owns The Church Green in Lymm
 David Strettle (born 1983 in Lymm), Saracens F.C. rugby union player
 Dan Logan (born 1985), English musician, brought up in Lymm
 Harry Worley (born 1988 in Lymm), retired English professional footballer, 140 professional appearances
 Tom Murray (born 1990), English professional golfer, lives in Lymm

In popular culture 
The 2011 television series Candy Cabs was filmed in Lymm. The 2015 Sky 1 television series After Hours was filmed in Lymm in 2014.
A scene from Paul Abbot's No Offence TV series was filmed in Lymm in 2014.

Lymm has its own radio station, which was created in 2020. It broadcasts 24 hours a day and is run by volunteers.

See also 

 Listed buildings in Lymm

References

External links 

Villages in Cheshire
Warrington
Civil parishes in Warrington